Valdovecaria is a genus of moths of the family Pyralidae.

Species
Valdovecaria bradyrrhoella Zerny, 1927
Valdovecaria hispanicella (Herrich-Schäffer, 1849)
Valdovecaria umbratella (Treitschke, 1833)
Valdovecaria unipunctella (Chrétien, 1911)

References

Anerastiini
Pyralidae genera